Eduardo Orrego Villacorta (September 12, 1933 in Chiclayo – December 24, 1994 in Lima), was a Peruvian architect and politician in the early 1980s.

He studied architecture in Universidad Nacional de Ingeniería (UNI). Orrego was the mayor of Lima from 1981 to 1983.

 

Mayors of Lima
Peruvian architects
1933 births
1994 deaths
20th-century Peruvian architects
National University of Engineering alumni